Place d'Armes is an urban park in Quebec City, Quebec, Canada. It is bounded by Rue Saint-Anne to the north, Fort Street to the east, Rue Saint-Louis to the south and Rue du Trésor to the west. The park's name means a place of arms, which is the gathering place of a small troop and a central space hosting the important ceremonies of military life.

The park has a monument, part of a fountain (erected in 1915), in its centre.

The park was created between 1640 and 1648 by Governor Charles Jacques Huault de Montmagny. It became a public park in 1865.

The Château Frontenac overlooks the square from the south, and the Cathedral of the Holy Trinity from the west.

References

Parks in Quebec City
Urban public parks
1648 establishments in the British Empire